The 1919–20 William & Mary Indians men's basketball team represented the College of William & Mary in intercollegiate basketball during the 1919–20 season. Under the first year of head coach James G. Driver (who concurrently served as head football coach), the team finished the season with a 5–7 record. This was the 15th season of the collegiate basketball program at William & Mary, whose nickname is now the Tribe.

Schedule

|-
!colspan=9 style="background:#006400; color:#FFD700;"| Regular season

Source

References

William & Mary Tribe men's basketball seasons
William And Mary Indians
William and Mary Indians Men's Basketball Team
William and Mary Indians Men's Basketball Team